The 2015–16 Taça de Portugal was the 76th season of the Taça de Portugal, the premier knockout competition in Portuguese football. As of this season, it became also known as Taça de Portugal Placard due to sponsorship by sports betting game Placard.

The competition was contested by a total of 155 clubs – an increase of 20 clubs compared to the previous edition – including teams from the top-three tiers of the Portuguese football league system and representatives of the fourth-tier District leagues and cups. It began with the first-round matches on 5 September 2015 and concluded on 22 May 2016, with the final at the Estádio Nacional in Oeiras.

Making their second final appearance in two seasons, Braga defeated Porto 4–2 in a penalty shoot-out (following a 2–2 draw at the end of extra time to win the competition for the second time, 50 years after their first triumph in the 1965–66 edition. The title holders were Sporting CP, who were eliminated in the fifth round by Braga in a replay of the previous final.

Format 
As in the previous season, the competition format was organised in a knockout system consisting of seven rounds before the final match. For this season, the number of participating clubs increased from 135 to 155, to accommodate twice the number of teams from the District levels. The concept of repechage was introduced, meaning that teams eliminated in one round could still compete in later rounds, to provide an even number of teams necessary to avoid byes.

A total of 118 teams entered the tournament in the first round, 78 competing in the third-tier Campeonato de Portugal and 40 representatives from the District Football Associations. In the second round, the previous round winners were joined by the 19 teams competing in the second-tier LigaPro. In the third round, the 18 top-tier Primeira Liga teams entered the competition for the first time, playing against the 46 winners of the second round. In both second and third rounds, teams from higher tiers played away against teams from lower tiers; after the third round, the draw had no restrictions.

Unlike the earlier one-legged rounds, the semi-finals are played as two-legged ties, with home and away matches. The final is played as a one-off match at a neutral venue, traditionally the Estádio Nacional in Oeiras.

Teams 
A total of 155 teams competing in the top-four tiers of Portuguese football plus the winners (or losing finalists) of the District Football Association Cups were considered eligible by the Portuguese Football Federation to participate in the competition:

Schedule 
All draws are held at the FPF headquarters in Lisbon. Match kick-off times are in WET (UTC+0) from the fourth round to the semi-finals, and in WEST (UTC+1) during the rest of the competition.

First round 
A total of 118 teams from the Campeonato de Portugal (CP) and the District Football Associations (D) entered the first round. The draw took place on Friday, 31 July 2015, at 11:00 WEST. The teams were divided into eight groups of 14 or 16 teams according to geographic criteria. Matches were played on 5, 6, 16 and 23 September 2015.
 

Fixtures

Series A
 Torcatense (CP) 3–3   Maria da Fonte (D)
 Águia de Vimioso (D) 3–3   Amares (D)
 Atlético dos Arcos (D) 0–0   Limianos (CP)
 Vianense (CP) 1–0 Neves (CP)
 Montalegre (D) 1–0  Vitorino dos Piães (D)
 Pontassolense (D) 0–4 Argozelo (CP)
 Vilaverdense (CP) 1–2 Bragança (CP)
 Camacha (CP) 2–1 Pedras Salgadas (CP)

Series B
 São Martinho (CP) 2–0 Arões (CP)
 Fafe (CP) 1–0 Vizela (CP)
 Mondinense (CP) 3–2 Mirandela (CP)
 Tirsense (CP) 0–0   Felgueiras 1932 (CP)
 Vila Real (CP) 2–3  Amarante (CP)
 Pedras Rubras (CP) 1–0 AD Oliveirense (CP)
 Trofense (CP) 1–0 Sobrado (CP)

Series C
 Sanjoanense (CP) 4–1 Sousense (CP)
 Gondomar (CP) 2–1 Coimbrões (CP)
 Bustelo (CP) 0–1 Lusitânia de Lourosa (CP)
 Cinfães (CP) 0–1 Salgueiros (CP)
 Régua (D) 1–3 Rio Tinto (D)
 São Roque (D) 1–2 Torre de Moncorvo (D)
 Oliveira do Douro (D) 4–3  Cesarense (CP)

Series D
 Lusitano de Vildemoinhos (CP) 2–0 Gafanha (CP)
 Estarreja (CP) 5–2  Carregal do Sal (D)
 Tourizense (CP) 1–2 Oliveira do Hospital (CP)
 Oliveira de Frades (CP) 4–0 Manteigas (D)
 Recreio de Águeda (D) 4–0 Trancoso (D)
 Anadia (CP) 5–3 Sabugal (CP)
 Penalva do Castelo (D) 2–3  Mortágua (CP)

Series E
 Alcains (D) 0–1 Operário (CP)
 Rabo de Peixe (D) 1–4 União de Gavinhos (D)
 Águias do Moradal (CP) 6–1 Fayal (D)
 Sporting Ideal (CP) 3–0 Vigor da Mocidade (D)
 Pampilhosa (CP) 7–0 Estação (D)
 Praiense (CP) 7–0 Mira Mar (D)
 AD Nogueirense (CP) 1–3 Naval 1º de Maio (CP)
 Angrense (CP) 2–1 Académica – SF (CP)

Series F
 Alcanenense (CP) 2–1 Eléctrico (CP)
 Peniche (CP) 1–2 Caldas (CP)
 Vitória de Sernache (CP) 1–2  Crato (CP)
 Benfica e Castelo Branco (CP) 9–0 Amiense (D)
 Leiria e Marrazes (D) 0–1 Ginásio de Alcobaça (D)
 União de Tomar (D) 0–7 União de Leiria (CP)
 Sertanense (CP) 4–0 Gavionenses (D)

Series G
 Alcochetense (D) 0–1 Loures (CP)
 Atlético da Malveira (CP) 5–2 Barreirense (CP)
 Mosteirense (D) 1–4 1º de Dezembro (CP)
 Redondense (D) 0–2 Sacavenense (CP)
 Real (CP) 3–1 Sintrense (CP)
 Cova da Piedade (CP) 1–0 Torreense (CP)
 Coruchense (CP) 2–1 Povoense (D)
 Casa Pia (CP) 1–3 Vilafranquense (D)

Series H
 Praia de Milfontes (D) 2–3 Sporting de Viana do Alentejo (D)
 Pinhalnovense (CP) 2–1 Atlético de Reguengos (CP)
 Almancilense (CP) 0–1 Moura (CP)
 Lagoa (D) 1–1   Amora (D)
 Juventude de Évora (CP) 0–5 Louletano (CP)
 Castrense (CP) 2–0 Vasco da Gama da Vidigueira (D)
 Lusitano VRSA (CP) 2–0 Moncarapachense (D)

Second round 
A total of 92 teams participated in the second round, comprising the 59 winners of the previous round, the 19 non-reserve teams competing in the 2015–16 LigaPro (II), and 14 teams randomly drawn from among the first-round losers (repechage). The draw took place on Monday, 14 September 2015, at 11:00 WEST. Matches were played on 26–27 September and 8 October 2015. According to the new competition regulations, Segunda Liga sides played their matches away against lower division opponents.
 

Repechage
The following 14 first-round losing teams were selected to compete in the second round:

 Alcochetense (D)
 Almancilense (CP)
 Amiense (D)
 Bustelo (CP)
 Casa Pia (CP)
 Coimbrões (CP)
 Gafanha (CP)
 Leiria e Marrazes (D)
 Limianos (CP)
 Manteigas (D)
 Mosteirense (D)
 Sabugal (CP)
 São Roque (D)
 Vitorino dos Piães (D)

Fixtures

Third round 
A total of 64 teams participated in the third round, which included the 46 winners of the previous round and the 18 teams competing in the 2015–16 Primeira Liga (I). The draw took place on Thursday, 1 October 2015, at 12:00 WEST. Matches were played on 16–18 October 2015. Similarly to what occurred with Segunda Liga teams in the previous round, Primeira Liga sides played their matches away against lower division teams.

Fixtures

Fourth round 
A total of 32 teams participated in the fourth round, all of which had advanced from the previous round. The draw took place on Friday, 23 October 2015, at 12:00 WEST, and unlike previous rounds, was free of restrictions. Matches were played on 20–22 November 2015.

Fixtures

Fifth round 
A total of 16 teams participated in the fifth round, all of which had advanced from the previous round. The draw took place on Thursday, 26 November 2015, at 11:00 WET. Matches were played on 15–17 December 2015.

Fixtures

Quarter-finals 
A total of eight teams participated in the quarter-finals, all of which had advanced from the previous round. The draw took place on Monday, 21 December 2015, at 12:00 WET. Matches were played on 13 January 2016.

Fixtures

Semi-finals 
The semi-final pairings were determined on 21 December 2015, following the draw for the quarter-finals. This round was contested over two legs in a home-and-away system; the first leg was played on 3–4 February and the second leg was played on 2 March 2016.

Fixtures

Porto won 5–0 on aggregate.

Braga won 1–0 on aggregate.

Final

Notes

References

External links
Official webpage 

2015-16
2015–16 European domestic association football cups
2015–16 in Portuguese football